The coat of arms of the Azores is nine gold stars superimposed on a red bordure, representing the nine islands of the archipelago. The bordure surrounds a silver shield on which a blue eagle is displayed with wings elevated and with red feet, beak, and tongue. The crest is a closed helm in gold lined with red, surmounted by a wreath and mantling of silver and blue, topped by another blue eagle on which are superimposed the same nine gold stars.  

The shield is supported by two chained black bulls, above a scroll containing the motto Antes morrer livres que em paz sujeitos. The supporters each hold a flagpole. Their collars, chains, and hooves are gold, their horns silver. The flags bear Christian symbols. The flag dexter, that is, on the viewer's left, is the red cross of the Portuguese Order of Christ on a white field. The flag sinister, that is, on the viewer's right, is a white dove superimposed on gold rays in the shape of a cross - the emblem of the Holy Spirit - on a red field, both flags bordered in gold.

Early Portuguese visitors mistook the local variety of buzzard, Buteo buteo rothschildi, for goshawks (Accipiter gentilis) and the Portuguese word for "goshawk", açor (pl. açores), is the root of the islands' name. Goshawks also remain a common motif in Azorean heraldry and vexillology.

Blazon 
The coat of arms was officially adopted by the Regional Decree n.º 4/79/A, published in the Diary of the Republic n.º 84/1979. It is blazoned in the article 3 as follows:

a) Shield: Argent, a goshawk displayed azure, beaked, langued, taloned and armed gules, a bordure gules, charged with nine mullets of five points or;

b) Helm: affronté, or, lined gules;

c) Crest: a goshawk issuant azure, beaked and langued gules, charged with nine mullets of five points or;

d) Mantling: azure and argent;

e) Supporters: two bulls sable, collared and chained or, dexter sustaining a banner of the Order of Christ, with lance azure, tip and guard or, and sinister sustaining a banner gules, a dove displayed argent, with lance azure, tip and guard or;

f) Motto: "Antes morrer livres que em paz sujeitos".

See also
Coat of arms of Portugal
Goshawk
Flag of the Azores
Hymn of the Azores

References

External links
 Açores: Heraldry of the World, includes a different rendering of the Coat of Arms

Azores
Government of the Azores
Azores
Azores
Azores
Azores
Azores